Onychostoma uniforme is a species of cyprinid in the genus Onychostoma. It inhabits Vietnam and is not considered harmful to humans.

References

uniforme
Cyprinid fish of Asia
Fish of Vietnam
IUCN Red List data deficient species